Liberty Steel Group Holdings UK Ltd (LHG), which is also referred to as Liberty House or Liberty House UK, is a British industrial and metals company founded in the United Kingdom in 1992 by industrialist Sanjeev Gupta. It is headquartered in London, England, and has offices in Dubai, Singapore and Hong Kong. 

The holding company of Liberty Steel, Liberty House Group PTE Ltd is based in Singapore. The company focuses on ferrous and non-ferrous metal trading, metals recycling, steel and aluminium production, and engineering products and services. Gupta controls it through his vehicle GFG Alliance.

History
LHG was founded by Sanjeev Gupta in 1992.

LHG, together with the SIMEC Group, part of the GFG Alliance, purchased the Lochaber aluminium smelter plant as well as the Laggan Dam from Rio Tinto in November 2016.

In February 2017, LHG agreed to purchase the specialty steel division of Tata Steel Europe for £100 million. The purchase included the division's facilities in Rotherham, Stocksbridge and Brinsworth in South Yorkshire and Wednesbury in the West Midlands.

In July 2017, LHG purchased South Australian steelmaker Arrium which was rebadged LibertyOneSteel for the first year of ownership and is now Liberty Steel.

In October 2019, GFG Alliance promised to merge its steel assets into Liberty Steel Group by year end.

In 2020, LHG received European Union approval to purchase the Duffel, Belgium plant of aluminium smelter operator Aleris which cleared the way for the purchase of Aleris by Novelis.

On 19 February 2021 ThyssenKrupp (TK) ended discussions with Liberty Steel, which had proposed to take over the former's steel unit. The TK plant at Duisburg Germany was valued by the owner at €1.5 billion but TK posted a €960 million loss in 2020 and Liberty sought to dispossess TK for no or reverse payment.

On 31 March 2021 Credit Suisse filed insolvency proceedings against Liberty Commodities (a LHG subsidiary) in a London court. The action was brought by a unit of another bank, Citigroup, which was acting under instruction from Credit Suisse. The Swiss bankers are on the hook for a $10 billion fund part of which was invested in Greensill Capital which had placed $3.6 billion in LHG parent company GFG, part of which had funnelled down to LCL. The balance sheet of Credit Suisse would absorb significant damage as a result.

On 2 April 2021, Gupta claimed that none of its plants would close under his watch as he raced to refinance his business after the collapse of financial backer Greensill. Liberty Steel had 3,000 employees, while GFG Alliance had another 2,000 in other UK metals and engineering businesses. In April 2021, Secretary of State for Business, Energy and Industrial Strategy Kwasi Kwarteng rejected a request to bail LSG out. In February 2022, HM Revenue & Customs sought winding up petitions against four LSG subsidiaries.

References

External links

1992 establishments in England
British companies established in 1992
Steel companies based in London
Manufacturing companies established in 1992
Aluminium smelters